Hadrianopolis was a town of ancient Macedonia.

Its site is located near Adriani in Greece.

References

Populated places in ancient Macedonia
Former populated places in Greece
Hadrian